Heinrich Bresnitz (born 1844) was an Austrian author and journalist.

Bresnitz was born in 1844 in Czernowitz, Bukowina, and established himself as a journalist and editor in Vienna. There he founded in 1867 a periodical, Der Osten, and in 1869 a political journal, Der Patriot. From 1879 to 1886 he was the proprietor and chief editor of the Morgen-Post. He also anonymously published a number of political pamphlets. In 1893 Bresnitz moved to Bulgaria.

Publications

References
 

1844 births
Date of death missing
19th-century Austrian Jews
Austro-Hungarian Jews
Bukovina Jews
Journalists from Vienna
Pamphleteers
Political journalists
Writers from Chernivtsi